Besoijen is a former village in the Netherlands. Until 1922, it was a separate municipality, but it is now a neighbourhood of Waalwijk.

Former municipalities of North Brabant